Face is the debut studio album by South Korean singer Key. It was released on November 26, 2018, through SM Entertainment. "One of Those Nights" and "Forever Yours" (featuring Crush and Soyou, respectively) served as the album's lead singles.

On February 25, 2019, it was announced that the album would be repackaged as I Wanna Be on March 4.

Background and release
On October 11, 2018, SM Entertainment announced that Key would be the third member of Shinee to make a solo debut, with an estimated release date of November. On November 7, 2018, the album's first lead single, "Forever Yours" was released, featuring former Sistar member, Soyou.

The first image teasers for the album dropped on November 19, along with the title and tracklist. The teaser for lead single "One of These Nights" featuring Crush was released on November 25. The album and MV were released the following day.

On February 25, it was revealed that the title of the re-packaged album was I Wanna Be and that it would be released on March 4, 2019, with three new songs, including the title track "I Wanna Be" featuring (G)I-dle's Soyeon.

Commercial performance
Face peaked at number five on Korea's Gaon Album Chart, number 18 on Japan's Oricon Albums Chart, number 195 on the French SNEP download albums chart, and number 9 on the US World Albums chart.

Critical reception

Track listing

Charts

References

2018 debut albums
Key (entertainer) albums
Korean-language albums
SM Entertainment albums
IRiver albums